The following is a list of massacres that have occurred in Vietnam and its predecessors:

Vietnam
Massacres

Massacres